The Andes, Andes Mountains or Andean Mountain Range are the longest continental mountain range in the world, forming a continuous highland along the western edge of South America. The Andes extend from north to south through seven South American countries: Venezuela, Colombia, Ecuador, Peru, Bolivia, Chile, and Argentina.

Along their length, the Andes are split into several ranges, separated by intermediate depressions. The Andes are the location of several high plateaus—some of which host major cities such as Quito, Bogotá, Cali, Arequipa, Medellín, Bucaramanga, Sucre, Mérida, El Alto and La Paz. The Altiplano plateau is the world's second-highest after the Tibetan Plateau. These ranges are in turn grouped into three major divisions based on climate: the Tropical Andes, the Dry Andes, and the Wet Andes.

The Andes Mountains are the highest mountain range outside Asia. The peak of Chimborazo in the Ecuadorian Andes is farther from the Earth's center than any other location on the Earth's surface, due to the equatorial bulge resulting from the Earth's rotation.

The Andes are also part of the American Cordillera, a chain of mountain ranges (cordillera) that consists of an almost continuous sequence of mountain ranges that form the western "backbone" of the Americas and Antarctica.

Etymology
The etymology of the word Andes has been debated. The majority consensus is that it derives from the Quechua word  'east' as in Antisuyu (Quechua for 'east region'), one of the four regions of the Inca Empire.

The term cordillera comes from the Spanish word cordel 'rope' and is used as a descriptive name for several contiguous sections of the Andes, as well as the entire Andean range, and the combined mountain chain along the western part of the North and South American continents.

Geography

The Andes can be divided into three sections:
 The Southern Andes in Argentina and Chile, south of Llullaillaco.
 The Central Andes in Peru and Bolivia.
 The Northern Andes in Venezuela, Colombia, and Ecuador. In the northern part of the Andes, the separate Sierra Nevada de Santa Marta range is often treated as part of the Northern Andes.

The Leeward Antilles islands Aruba, Bonaire, and Curaçao, which lie in the Caribbean Sea off the coast of Venezuela, were formerly thought to represent the submerged peaks of the extreme northern edge of the Andes range, but ongoing geological studies indicate that such a simplification does not do justice to the complex tectonic boundary between the South American and Caribbean plates.

Geology

The Andes are a Mesozoic–Tertiary orogenic belt of mountains along the Pacific Ring of Fire, a zone of volcanic activity that encompasses the Pacific rim of the Americas as well as the Asia-Pacific region. The Andes are the result of tectonic plate processes, caused by the subduction of oceanic crust beneath the South American Plate as the Nazca Plate and South American Plate converge. These processes were accelerated by the effects of climate. As the uplift of the Andes created a rain shadow on the western fringes of Chile, ocean currents and prevailing winds carried moisture away from the Chilean coast. This caused some areas of the subduction zone to be sediment starved, causing excess friction and an increased rate of compressed coastal uplift. The main cause of the rise of the Andes is the compression of the western rim of the South American Plate due to the subduction of the Nazca Plate and the Antarctic Plate.To the east, the Andes range is bounded by several sedimentary basins, such as Orinoco, Amazon Basin, Madre de Dios and Gran Chaco, that separate the Andes from the ancient cratons in eastern South America. In the south, the Andes share a long boundary with the former Patagonia Terrane. To the west, the Andes end at the Pacific Ocean, although the Peru-Chile trench can be considered their ultimate western limit. From a geographical approach, the Andes are considered to have their western boundaries marked by the appearance of coastal lowlands and a less rugged topography. The Andes Mountains also contain large quantities of iron ore located in many mountains within the range.

The Andean orogen has a series of bends or oroclines. The Bolivian Orocline is a seaward concave bending in the coast of South America and the Andes Mountains at about 18° S. At this point, the orientation of the Andes turns from Northwest in Peru to South in Chile and Argentina. The Andean segment north and south of the Orocline have been rotated 15° to 20° counter clockwise and clockwise respectively. The Bolivian Orocline area overlaps with the area of maximum width of the Altiplano Plateau and according to Isacks (1988) the Orocline is related to crustal shortening. The specific point at 18° S where the coastline bends is known as the "Arica Elbow". Further south lies the Maipo Orocline a more subtle Orocline between 30° S and 38°S with a seaward-concave break in trend at 33° S. Near the southern tip of the Andes lies the Patagonian Orocline.

Orogeny

The western rim of the South American Plate has been the place of several pre-Andean orogenies since at least the late Proterozoic and early Paleozoic, when several terranes and microcontinents collided and amalgamated with the ancient cratons of eastern South America, by then the South American part of Gondwana.

The formation of the modern Andes began with the events of the Triassic when Pangaea began the break up that resulted in developing several rifts. The development continued through the Jurassic Period. It was during the Cretaceous Period that the Andes began to take their present form, by the uplifting, faulting and folding of sedimentary and metamorphic rocks of the ancient cratons to the east. The rise of the Andes has not been constant, as different regions have had different degrees of tectonic stress, uplift, and erosion.

Tectonic forces above the subduction zone along the entire west coast of South America where the Nazca Plate and a part of the Antarctic Plate are sliding beneath the South American Plate continue to produce an ongoing orogenic event resulting in minor to major earthquakes and volcanic eruptions to this day. In the extreme south, a major transform fault separates Tierra del Fuego from the small Scotia Plate.

The regions immediately east of the Andes experience a series of changes resulting from the Andean orogeny. Parts of the Sunsás Orogen in Amazonian craton disappeared from the surface of earth being overridden by the Andes.
The Sierras de Córdoba, where the effects of the ancient Pampean orogeny can be observed, owe their modern uplift and relief to the Andean orogeny in the Tertiary. Further south in southern Patagonia the onset of the Andean orogeny caused the Magallanes Basin to evolve from being an extensional back-arc basin in the Mesozoic to being a compressional foreland basin in the Cenozoic.

Volcanism

The Andes range has many active volcanoes distributed in four volcanic zones separated by areas of inactivity. The Andean volcanism is a result of subduction of the Nazca Plate and Antarctic Plate underneath the South American Plate. The belt is subdivided into four main volcanic zones that are separated from each other by volcanic gaps. The volcanoes of the belt are diverse in terms of activity style, products and morphology. While some differences can be explained by which volcanic zone a volcano belongs to, there are significant differences inside volcanic zones and even between neighbouring volcanoes. Despite being a type location for calc-alkalic and subduction volcanism, the Andean Volcanic Belt has a large range of volcano-tectonic settings, such as rift systems and extensional zones, transpressional faults, subduction of mid-ocean ridges and seamount chains apart from a large range of crustal thicknesses and magma ascent paths, and different amount of crustal assimilations.

Ore deposits and evaporates
The Andes Mountains host large ore and salt deposits and some of their eastern fold and thrust belt acts as traps for commercially exploitable amounts of hydrocarbons. In the forelands of the Atacama Desert some of the largest porphyry copper mineralizations occur making Chile and Peru the first- and second-largest exporters of copper in the world. Porphyry copper in the western slopes of the Andes has been generated by hydrothermal fluids (mostly water) during the cooling of plutons or volcanic systems. The porphyry mineralization further benefited from the dry climate that let them largely out of the disturbing actions of meteoric water. The dry climate in the central western Andes has also led to the creation of extensive saltpeter deposits which were extensively mined until the invention of synthetic nitrates. Yet another result of the dry climate are the salars of Atacama and Uyuni, the first one being the largest source of lithium today and the second the world's largest reserve of the element. Early Mesozoic and Neogene plutonism in Bolivia's Cordillera Central created the Bolivian tin belt as well as the famous, now depleted, deposits of Cerro Rico de Potosí.

History

The Andes Mountains, initially inhabited by hunter-gatherers, experienced the development of agriculture and rise of politically centralised civilizations, which culminated in the establishment of the century-long Inca Empire. This all changed in the 16th century, when the Spanish conquistadors colonized the mountains in the advance of the mining economy.

In tide of anti-imperialist nationalism, the Andes became the scene of a series of independence wars in the 19th century when rebel forces swept through the region to overthrow Spanish colonial rule. Since then, many former Spanish territories have become five independent Andean states.

Climate and hydrology

The climate in the Andes varies greatly depending on latitude, altitude, and proximity to the sea. Temperature, atmospheric pressure and humidity decrease in higher elevations. The southern section is rainy and cool, the central section is dry. The climate is known to change drastically in rather short distances. Rainforests exist just kilometres away from the snow-covered peak Cotopaxi. The mountains have a large effect on the temperatures of nearby areas. The snow line depends on the location.

The Andes of Chile and Argentina can be divided into two climatic and glaciological zones: the Dry Andes and the Wet Andes. Since the Dry Andes extend from the latitudes of Atacama Desert to the area of Maule River, precipitation is more sporadic and there are strong temperature oscillations. The line of equilibrium may shift drastically over short periods of time, leaving a whole glacier in the ablation area or in the accumulation area.

In the high Andes of Central Chile and Mendoza Province, rock glaciers are larger and more common than glaciers; this is due to the high exposure to solar radiation. In these regions glaciers occur typically at higher altitudes than rock glaciers. The lowest active rock glacier occur at 900 m a.s.l. in Aconcagua.

Though precipitation increases with the height, there are semiarid conditions in the nearly  highest mountains of the Andes. This dry steppe climate is considered to be typical of the subtropical position at 32–34° S. The valley bottoms have no woods, just dwarf scrub. The largest glaciers, for example the Plomo glacier and the Horcones glaciers, do not even reach  in length and have an only insignificant ice thickness. At glacial times, however, c. 20,000 years ago, the glaciers were over ten times longer. The massifs of Cerro Aconcagua, Cerro Tupungato and Nevado Juncal are tens of kilometres away from each other and were connected by a joint ice stream network.

Flora

The Andean region cuts across several natural and floristic regions, due to its extension, from Caribbean Venezuela to cold, windy and wet Cape Horn passing through the hyperarid Atacama Desert. Rainforests and tropical dry forests used to encircle much of the northern Andes but are now greatly diminished, especially in the Chocó and inter-Andean valleys of Colombia. Opposite of the humid Andean slopes are the relatively dry Andean slopes in most of western Peru, Chile and Argentina. Along with several Interandean Valles, they are typically dominated by deciduous woodland, shrub and xeric vegetation, reaching the extreme in the slopes near the virtually lifeless Atacama Desert.

About 30,000 species of vascular plants live in the Andes, with roughly half being endemic to the region, surpassing the diversity of any other hotspot. The small tree Cinchona pubescens, a source of quinine which is used to treat malaria, is found widely in the Andes as far south as Bolivia. Other important crops that originated from the Andes are tobacco and potatoes. The high-altitude Polylepis forests and woodlands are found in the Andean areas of Colombia, Ecuador, Peru, Bolivia and Chile. It remains unclear if the patchy distribution of these forests and woodlands is natural, or the result of clearing which began during the Incan period. Regardless, in modern times the clearance has accelerated, and the trees are now considered to be highly endangered, with some believing that as little as 10% of the original woodland remains.

Fauna

The Andes are rich in fauna: With almost 1,000 species, of which roughly 2/3 are endemic to the region, the Andes are the most important region in the world for amphibians.
The diversity of animals in the Andes is high, with almost 600 species of mammals (13% endemic), more than 1,700 species of birds (about 1/3 endemic), more than 600 species of reptile (about 45% endemic), and almost 400 species of fish (about 1/3 endemic).

The vicuña and guanaco can be found living in the Altiplano, while the closely related domesticated llama and alpaca are widely kept by locals as pack animals and for their meat and wool. The crepuscular (active during dawn and dusk) chinchillas, two threatened members of the rodent order, inhabit the Andes' alpine regions. The Andean condor, the largest bird of its kind in the Western Hemisphere, occurs throughout much of the Andes but generally in very low densities. Other animals found in the relatively open habitats of the high Andes include the huemul, cougar, foxes in the genus Pseudalopex, and, for birds, certain species of tinamous (notably members of the genus Nothoprocta), Andean goose, giant coot, flamingos (mainly associated with hypersaline lakes), lesser rhea, Andean flicker, diademed sandpiper-plover, miners, sierra-finches and diuca-finches.

Lake Titicaca hosts several endemics, among them the highly endangered Titicaca flightless grebe and Titicaca water frog. A few species of hummingbirds, notably some hillstars, can be seen at altitudes above , but far higher diversities can be found at lower altitudes, especially in the humid Andean forests ("cloud forests") growing on slopes in Colombia, Ecuador, Peru, Bolivia and far northwestern Argentina. These forest-types, which includes the Yungas and parts of the Chocó, are very rich in flora and fauna, although few large mammals exist, exceptions being the threatened mountain tapir, spectacled bear and yellow-tailed woolly monkey.

Birds of humid Andean forests include mountain-toucans, quetzals and the Andean cock-of-the-rock, while mixed species flocks dominated by tanagers and furnariids commonly are seen – in contrast to several vocal but typically cryptic species of wrens, tapaculos and antpittas.

A number of species such as the royal cinclodes and white-browed tit-spinetail are associated with Polylepis, and consequently also threatened.

Human activity

The Andes Mountains form a north–south axis of cultural influences. A long series of cultural development culminated in the expansion of the Inca civilization and Inca Empire in the central Andes during the 15th century. The Incas formed this civilization through imperialistic militarism as well as careful and meticulous governmental management. The government sponsored the construction of aqueducts and roads in addition to preexisting installations. Some of these constructions are still in existence today.

Devastated by European diseases and by civil war, the Incas were defeated in 1532 by an alliance composed of tens of thousands of allies from nations they had subjugated (e.g. Huancas, Chachapoyas, Cañaris) and a small army of 180 Spaniards led by Francisco Pizarro. One of the few Inca sites the Spanish never found in their conquest was Machu Picchu, which lay hidden on a peak on the eastern edge of the Andes where they descend to the Amazon. The main surviving languages of the Andean peoples are those of the Quechua and Aymara language families. Woodbine Parish and Joseph Barclay Pentland surveyed a large part of the Bolivian Andes from 1826 to 1827.

Cities

In modern times, the largest cities in the Andes are Bogotá, with a metropolitan population of over ten million, and Santiago, Medellín, Cali, and Quito. Lima is a coastal city adjacent to the Andes and is the largest city of all Andean countries. It is the seat of the Andean Community of Nations.

Other cities in or near the Andes include Bariloche, Catamarca, Jujuy, Mendoza, Salta, San Juan, Tucumán, and Ushuaia in Argentina; Calama and Rancagua in Chile; Cochabamba, Oruro, Potosí, Sucre, Sacaba, Tarija, and Yacuiba in Bolivia; Arequipa, Cajamarca, Cusco, Huancayo, Huánuco, Huaraz, Juliaca, and Puno in Peru; Ambato, Cuenca, Ibarra, Latacunga, Loja, Riobamba and Tulcán in Ecuador; Armenia, Cúcuta, Bucaramanga, Duitama, Ibagué, Ipiales, Manizales, Palmira, Pasto, Pereira, Popayán, Sogamoso, Tunja, and Villavicencio in Colombia; and Barquisimeto, La Grita, Mérida, San Cristóbal, Tovar, Trujillo, and Valera in Venezuela. The cities of Caracas, Valencia, and Maracay are in the Venezuelan Coastal Range, which is a debatable extension of the Andes at the northern extremity of South America.

Transportation

Cities and large towns are connected with asphalt-paved roads, while smaller towns are often connected by dirt roads, which may require a four-wheel-drive vehicle.

The rough terrain has historically put the costs of building highways and railroads that cross the Andes out of reach of most neighboring countries, even with modern civil engineering practices. For example, the main crossover of the Andes between Argentina and Chile is still accomplished through the Paso Internacional Los Libertadores. Only recently the ends of some highways that came rather close to one another from the east and the west have been connected. Much of the transportation of passengers is done via aircraft.

However, there is one railroad that connects Chile with Peru via the Andes, and there are others that make the same connection via southern Bolivia. See railroad maps of that region.

There are multiple highways in Bolivia that cross the Andes. Some of these were built during a period of war between Bolivia and Paraguay, in order to transport Bolivian troops and their supplies to the war front in the lowlands of southeastern Bolivia and western Paraguay.

For decades, Chile claimed ownership of land on the eastern side of the Andes. However, these claims were given up in about 1870 during the War of the Pacific between Chile and the allied Bolivia and Peru, in a diplomatic deal to keep Peru out of the war. The Chilean Army and Chilean Navy defeated the combined forces of Bolivia and Peru, and Chile took over Bolivia's only province on the Pacific Coast, some land from Peru that was returned to Peru decades later. Bolivia has been a completely landlocked country ever since. It mostly uses seaports in eastern Argentina and Uruguay for international trade because its diplomatic relations with Chile have been suspended since 1978.

Because of the tortuous terrain in places, villages and towns in the mountains—to which travel via motorized vehicles is of little use—are still located in the high Andes of Chile, Bolivia, Peru, and Ecuador. Locally, the relatives of the camel, the llama, and the alpaca continue to carry out important uses as pack animals, but this use has generally diminished in modern times. Donkeys, mules, and horses are also useful.

Agriculture

The ancient peoples of the Andes such as the Incas have practiced irrigation techniques for over 6,000 years. Because of the mountain slopes, terracing has been a common practice. Terracing, however, was only extensively employed after Incan imperial expansions to fuel their expanding realm. The potato holds a very important role as an internally consumed staple crop. Maize was also an important crop for these people, and was used for the production of chicha, important to Andean native people. Currently, tobacco, cotton and coffee are the main export crops. Coca, despite eradication programmes in some countries, remains an important crop for legal local use in a mildly stimulating herbal tea, and, both controversially and illegally, for the production of cocaine.

Irrigation

In unirrigated land, pasture is the most common type of land use. In the rainy season (summer), part of the rangeland is used for cropping (mainly potatoes, barley, broad beans and wheat).

Irrigation is helpful in advancing the sowing data of the summer crops which guarantees an early yield in the period of food shortage. Also, by early sowing, maize can be cultivated higher up in the mountains (up to ). In addition, it makes cropping in the dry season (winter) possible and allows the cultivation of frost-resistant vegetable crops like onion and carrot.

Mining

The Andes rose to fame for their mineral wealth during the Spanish conquest of South America. Although Andean Amerindian peoples crafted ceremonial jewelry of gold and other metals, the mineralizations of the Andes were first mined on a large scale after the Spanish arrival. Potosí in present-day Bolivia and Cerro de Pasco in Peru were among the principal mines of the Spanish Empire in the New World. Río de la Plata and Argentina derive their names from the silver of Potosí.

Currently, mining in the Andes of Chile and Peru places these countries as the first and second major producers of copper in the world. Peru also contains the 4th largest goldmine in the world: the Yanacocha. The Bolivian Andes produce principally tin although historically silver mining had a huge impact on the economy of 17th century Europe.

There is a long history of mining in the Andes, from the Spanish silver mines in Potosí in the 16th century to the vast current porphyry copper deposits of Chuquicamata and Escondida in Chile and Toquepala in Peru. Other metals including iron, gold, and tin in addition to non-metallic resources are important. The Andes also have a vast supply of lithium unmatched by any other region in the world. as they are home to Argentina, Bolivia, and Chile which have the 3 largest reserves in the world respectively

Peaks

This list contains some of the major peaks in the Andes mountain range. The highest peak is Aconcagua of Argentina (see below).

Argentina

 Aconcagua, 
 Cerro Bonete, 
 Galán, 
 Mercedario, 
 Pissis,

Border between Argentina and Chile

 Cerro Bayo, 
 Cerro Fitz Roy,  or 3,405 m, Patagonia, also known as Cerro Chaltén
 Cerro Escorial, 
 Cordón del Azufre, 
 Falso Azufre, 
 Incahuasi, 
 Lastarria, 
 Llullaillaco, 
 Maipo, 
 Marmolejo, 
 Ojos del Salado, 
 Olca, 
 Sierra Nevada de Lagunas Bravas, 
 Socompa, 
 Nevado Tres Cruces,  (south summit) (III Region)
 Tronador, 
 Tupungato, 
 Nacimiento,

Bolivia

 Janq'u Uma, 
 Cabaraya, 
 Chacaltaya, 
 Wayna Potosí, 
 Illampu, 
 Illimani, 
 Laram Q'awa, 
 Macizo de Pacuni, 
 Nevado Anallajsi, 
 Nevado Sajama, 
 Patilla Pata, 
 Tata Sabaya,

Border between Bolivia and Chile

 Acotango, 
 Michincha, 
 Iru Phutunqu, 
 Licancabur, 
 Olca, 
 Parinacota, 
 Paruma, 
 Pomerape,

Chile

 Monte San Valentin, 
 Cerro Paine Grande, 
 Cerro Macá, c.
 Monte Darwin, c.
 Volcan Hudson, c.
 Cerro Castillo Dynevor, c.
 Mount Tarn, c.
 Polleras, c.
 Acamarachi, c.

Colombia

 Nevado del Huila, 
 Nevado del Ruiz, 
 Nevado del Tolima, 
 Pico Pan de Azúcar, 
 Ritacuba Negro, 
 Nevado del Cumbal, 
 Cerro Negro de Mayasquer, 
 Ritacuba Blanco, 
 Nevado del Quindío, 
 Puracé, 
 Santa Isabel, 
 Doña Juana, 
 Galeras, 
 Azufral,

Ecuador

 Antisana, 
 Cayambe, 
 Chiles, 
 Chimborazo, 
 Corazón, 
 Cotopaxi, 
 El Altar, 
 Illiniza, 
 Pichincha, 
 Quilotoa, 
 Reventador, 
 Sangay, 
 Tungurahua,

Peru

 Alpamayo, 
 Artesonraju, 
 Carnicero, 
 Chumpe, 
 Coropuna, 
 El Misti, 
 El Toro, 
 Huandoy, 
 Huascarán, 
 Jirishanca, 
 Pumasillo, 
 Rasac, 
 Rondoy, 
 Sarapo, 
 Salcantay, 
 Seria Norte, 
 Siula Grande, 
 Huaytapallana, 
 Yerupaja, 
 Yerupaja Chico,

Venezuela

 Pico Bolívar, 
 Pico Humboldt, 
 Pico Bonpland, 
 Pico La Concha, 
 Pico Piedras Blancas, 
 Pico El Águila, 
 Pico El Toro 
 Pico El León 
 Pico Mucuñuque

See also

 Andean Geology—a scientific journal
 Andesite line
 Apu (god)
 Mountain passes of the Andes
 List of mountain ranges

Notes

References

 
 Biggar, J. (2005). The Andes: A Guide For Climbers. 3rd. edition. Andes: Kirkcudbrightshire. 
 de Roy, T. (2005). The Andes: As the Condor Flies. Firefly books: Richmond Hill. 
 Fjeldså, J. & N. Krabbe (1990). The Birds of the High Andes. Zoological Museum, University of Copenhagen: 
 Fjeldså, J. & M. Kessler (1996). Conserving the biological diversity of Polylepis woodlands of the highlands on Peru and Bolivia, a contribution to sustainable natural resource management in the Andes. NORDECO: Copenhagen.

Bibliography

External links
 University of Arizona: Andes geology
 Blueplanetbiomes.org: Climate and animal life of the Andes 
 Discover-peru.org: Regions and Microclimates in the Andes
 Peaklist.org: Complete list of mountains in South America with an elevation at/above 

 
Mountain ranges of South America

Regions of South America
Physiographic divisions